Names Hill is a bluff located on the bank of the Green River in the U.S. state of Wyoming, where travelers on the Oregon and California trails carved their names into the rock.  It is one of three notable "recording areas" along the emigrant trails in Wyoming along with Register Cliff and Independence Rock. The site was listed on the National Register of Historic Places on April 16, 1969.

History
Names Hill was located near a heavily used crossing of the Green River.  The earliest human recordings at the site are Native American pictographs. European American names began appearing as early as 1822 as mountain men crossed the river on their way to the beaver streams of the Western Rocky Mountains.  In 1844, Caleb Greenwood and Isaac Hitchcock lead the first wagon train over what would later be called the Sublette-Greenwood Cutoff, along the way crossing the Green River at Names Hill.  The wagon trains would rest at the Green River following a  waterless trek across the prairie, providing an opportunity for travelers to add their names to the hill.

Among the more famous names inscribed on the rock is famed mountain man Jim Bridger. Some have disputed the authenticity of the signature as Bridger was thought to have been illiterate.

References

Further reading

External links

Names Hill State Historic Site Wyoming State Parks, Historic Sites & Trails 
Names Hill Wyoming State Historic Preservation Office

Landforms of Lincoln County, Wyoming
California Trail
Oregon Trail
Hills of the United States
Wyoming state historic sites
National Register of Historic Places in Lincoln County, Wyoming
Inscribed rocks
Transportation on the National Register of Historic Places in Wyoming
IUCN Category III